William Goldsmith alias Smith (by 1475 – 1517), of Gloucester, was an English politician.

He was a Member (MP) of the Parliament of England for Gloucester in 1512.

References

15th-century births
1517 deaths
English MPs 1512–1514
Members of the Parliament of England (pre-1707) for Gloucester